Rokupr is a small town in Kambia District in the Northern Province of Sierra Leone. As of 2013 it had an estimated population of 12,744.

Geography
It has an average elevation of 18 metres (62 feet).

References

Populated places in Sierra Leone